Sargezi (also Romanized as Sargezī) is a village in Margan Rural District, in the Central District of Hirmand County, Sistan and Baluchestan Province, Iran. At the 2006 census, its population was 83, in 16 families.

References 

Populated places in Hirmand County